Grief is a multi-faceted response to loss.

Grief may also refer to:

Grief (band), an American doom metal band
"Grief" (Gargoyles), an episode of the animated TV series Gargoyles
Grief (novel), by Andrew Holleran
Grief, a 1993 film by Richard Glatzer
"Grief", the colloquial name for the Adams Memorial statue in Washington, D.C.
Grief, an alternate title of Lover's Grief over the Yellow River, a 1999 Chinese film

People with the surname
Howard Grief (1940–2013), Israeli lawyer
Glenn Grief (born 1973), Australian rugby league player

See also 
Good Grief (disambiguation)
Griefer, a video gaming slang term